Christian Friedrich August Dillmann (25 April 18237 July 1894) was a German orientalist and biblical scholar.

Life
The son of a Württemberg schoolmaster, he was born at Illingen. He was educated at the University of Tübingen, where he became a pupil and friend of Heinrich Ewald, and studied under Ferdinand Christian Baur, though he did not join the new Tübingen school. For a short time he worked as pastor at Sersheim, near his native place, but he soon came to feel that his studies demanded his whole time.

He devoted himself to the study of Ethiopic manuscripts in the libraries of Paris, London and Oxford, and this work caused a revival of Ethiopic study in the 19th century. In 1847 and 1848 he prepared catalogues of the Ethiopic manuscripts in the British Museum (now the British Library) and the Bodleian Library at Oxford. He then set to work upon an edition of the Ethiopic Bible.

Returning to Tübingen in 1848, in 1853 he was appointed professor extraordinarius. Subsequently, he became professor of philosophy at the University of Kiel (1854), and of theology in Giessen (1864) and Berlin (1869), where he succeeded Ernst Wilhelm Hengstenberg.

Works
In 1851 he had published the "Book of Enoch" in Ethiopian (German, 1853; English, 1893), and at Kiel he completed the first part of the Ethiopic bible, Octateuchus Aethiopicus (1853–55). In 1857 appeared his Grammatik der äthiopischen Sprache (2nd edition by Carl Bezold, 1899); in 1859 the "Book of Jubilees"; in 1861 and 1871 another part of the Ethiopic bible, Libri Regum; in 1865 his great Lexicon linguæ aethiopicæ; in 1866 his Chrestomathia aethiopica.

Always a theologian at heart, he returned to theology in 1864. His Giessen lectures were published under the titles, Ursprung der alttestamentlichen Religion (1865) and Die Propheten des alten Bundes nach ihrer politischen Wirksamkeit (1868). In 1869 appeared his commentary on Hiob, (4th edition 1891) which stamped him as one of the foremost Old Testament exegetes.

His renown as a theologian was mainly founded on the series of commentaries, based on those of August Wilhelm Knobel's Die Genesis (Leipzig, 1875); Die Bücher Exodus und Leviticus, 1880; Die Bücher Numeri, Deuteronomium und Josua, with a dissertation on the origin of the Hexateuch, 1886; Der Prophet Jesaja, 1890. In 1877 he published the "Ascension of Isaiah" in Ethiopian and Latin. He was also a contributor to Daniel Schenkel's Bibellexikon, Brockhaus's Conversationslexikon, and Johann Jakob Herzog's Realencyklopädie. His book on Old Testament theology, Handbuch der alttestamentlichen Theologie, was published by Rudolf Kittel in 1895.

References

 George L. Robinson, "August Dillmann (Obituary)", in: The Biblical World 4/4 (1894), pp. 244–258.

External links
Online version of the Octateuchus Aethiopicus (1853) and several other Ethiopic books of the Bible edited by Dillmann.
Online version of the Chrestomathia Aethiopica (1886) at the Internet Archive.

1823 births
1894 deaths
Ethiopianists
German orientalists
German biblical scholars
Old Testament scholars
University of Tübingen alumni
German male non-fiction writers
People from Enzkreis
Academic staff of the University of Giessen
Academic staff of the University of Tübingen
Academic staff of the Humboldt University of Berlin
Academic staff of the University of Kiel
Members of the Göttingen Academy of Sciences and Humanities